Mount Greville is a cone-shaped and deeply fissured mountain in South East Queensland, Australia. The mountain rises 720 m above sea level and is part of the Moogerah Peaks National Park. It lies approximately 100 km south west of Brisbane just outside the town of Boonah. Other prominent peaks in this Scenic Rim group of mountains includes Mount Edwards, Mount Moon and Mount French.

The local Uragapul people call this mountain, Meebatboogan, meaning place where the eagles rest.   In 1828, the mountain was named after the Scottish botanist Robert Kaye Greville by the European explorer Allan Cunningham.

Palm Gorge is situated on Mount Greville. This narrow gorge contains a nearly pure stand of Piccabeen Palms.

The easiest path to the summit is via the south-eastern track which passes through stands of Eucalyptus dura at higher altitudes. After rain, climbing the mountain can be dangerous due to slippery rocks and the path's proximity to sheer cliffs.

Mount Greville Is widely known to resemble a Kangaroo.

See also

 List of mountains in Australia

References

External links

 Moogerah Peaks National Park

Greville
Scenic Rim Region